Air-to-air combat is the engagement of combat aircraft in warfare in which primarily fixed-wing aircraft attempt to destroy enemy aircraft using guns, rockets and missiles. The Korean War saw the greatest amount of air-to-air combat since World War II. During the war the United States claimed to have shot down around 700 fighters. After the war the U.S. Air Force reviewed its figures in an investigation code-named Sabre Measure Charlie and downgraded the kill ratio of the North American F-86 Sabre against the Mikoyan-Gurevich MiG-15 by half from 14:1 to 7:1. One of the factors inflating US numbers was that most dogfights took place over enemy-controlled area. The only way to confirm kills was through gun camera photography. USAF pilots were credited with a kill if the gun camera showed their guns striking the enemy aircraft even if no one actually saw it go down. However, Soviet Air Force kill claims were also highly exaggerated, based upon inherent flaws in their film grading procedures. For instance, the S-13 gun camera was not aligned with either the gunsight or either cannons' ballistics. It ran only while the firing buttons were depressed. Film graders commonly included unit commanders and political commisars who would confirm a "kill"—sometimes even if one had not been claimed by a pilot—when the camera's crosshairs touched the target for two movie frames. During the first 16 months of combat Soviet V-VS units claimed 218 F-86s destroyed when only 36 (35 to the two elite IADs and one to the 50th IAD) had been lost. This results in a 600 per cent inflation rate in victory credits over actual Sabres destroyed. However, these figures are complicated by the fact that the Americans routinely attributed combat losses to landing accidents and other causes.

The Vietnam War saw a move away from cannon fire to air-to-air missiles. Although US forces maintained air supremacy throughout the war, there were still occasional dogfights and US and North Vietnamese aces. The North Vietnamese side claimed the Vietnam People's Air Force had 17 aces throughout the war, including Nguyễn Văn Cốc, who is also the top ace of Vietnam War with 9 kills: seven acknowledged by the United States Air Force.

During the 1947 conflict over Jammu and Kashmir, the Indian Air Force did not engage the Pakistan Air Force in air-to-air combat; however, it did provide effective transport and close air support to the Indian Army troops.

On 10 April 1959, an Indian English Electric Canberra was shot down while performing a Reconnaissance mission over Rawalpindi. The Canberra was shot down by a Pakistani F-86 Sabre flown by Flight Lieutenant M Younis of the No. 15 Squadron. The two crew members of the Canberra ejected and were later arrested by Pakistani authorities, this incident also marked the first aerial victory of the Pakistan Air Force.

The Indo-Pakistani War of 1965 was the first time the Indian Air Force actively engaged an enemy air force. By the time the conflict had ended, India had lost between 65 and 75 aircraft while Pakistan lost 20 aircraft.

During the Indo-Pakistani war of 1971, the Indian Air Force lost 45 aircraft while the Pakistani Air Force lost 75.

During the Iran–Iraq War of 1980–88, there were nearly 1,000 air-to-air engagements between Iran and Iraq, including the only known instances of helicopters dogfighting and shooting down other helicopters. The Falklands War of 1982 witnessed air combat between Argentine and British military aircraft. The Falkland Islands' runways were short and thus unable to support fighter jets, forcing Argentina to launch fighters from the mainland, which had an adverse effect on their loiter time. The Argentine forces lost 23 aircraft in air-to-air combat, out of a total of 134 fixed wing aircraft and helicopters lost during the conflict. During the 1990–91 Persian Gulf War 33 of Iraqi Armed Forces' 750 fixed wing aircraft were claimed as downed (23 were confirmed), compared to 14 coalition aircraft claimed as downed (4 losses are confirmed, one F/A-18 Hornet and three UAVs).

Aircraft lost to air-to-air combat

See also
 Project Dark Gene
 Air-to-air combat losses between the Soviet Union and the United States
 List of airliner shootdown incidents

Footnotes

References

Notes

Bibliography

External links
 Air to air victories over drugs smugglers

Korean War
Vietnam War
Gulf War
War in Afghanistan (2001–2021)
Iraq War
Cold War
War on terror